The Javelin Aircraft Company was an American aircraft manufacturer based in Wichita, Kansas. The company specialized in the design and manufacture of homebuilt aircraft in the form of plans for amateur construction.

Aircraft

References

Defunct aircraft manufacturers of the United States
Homebuilt aircraft